Atrococcus is a genus of true bugs belonging to the family Pseudococcidae.

The species of this genus are found in Europe and Russia.

Species:
 Atrococcus achilleae (Kiritchenko, 1936) 
 Atrococcus arakelianae (Ter-Grigorian, 1964)

References

Pseudococcidae